Kondagaon district is a district of Chhattisgarh, India, and separated from Bastar district on 24 January 2012. with headquarters in Kondagaon.It is mostly renowned for its bell metal craft and other art forms native to the tribal of Bastar. Also known as the Shilp sheher (lit. craft city) of Chhattisgarh owing to the variety of indigenous crafts produced in the area.

The common name for Kondagaon is Kondanar, which means 'village of horses' in Gondi. On 15 August 2011, Chief Minister Raman Singh declared Kondagaon as a separate district.

Demographics 

According to the 2011 census, the population was 578,326. 520,841 is rural and 57,485 urban. Scheduled Castes and Scheduled Tribes made up 4.15% and 70.1% of the population respectively.

At the time of the 2011 census, 42.44% of the population spoke Halbi, 28.06% Gondi, 22.21% Chhattisgarhi, 3.40% Hindi and 1.39% Bhatri as their first language.

Tourism 

Covered by green forest, Kondagaon is known for its natural environment and archeology. In the Keshkal block of district Kondagaon, more a dozen of waterfall and few caves have been found out a couple of years ago. Some of the best known waterfalls, caves, valleys and archeological sites include:

Waterfalls 
 Katulkasa Waterfall, Honhed
 Bijkudum Waterfall, Uper-murvend
 Umradah Waterfall
 Ling-Darha Waterfall
 Amadarha-1 Waterfall
 Amadarha-2 Waterfall
 Hankhi-kudum Waterfall
 Ghumur Waterfall
 Kudarwahi Waterfall
 Uperbedi Waterfall
 Mirde Waterfall
 Mutte-Khadka Waterfall
 Cherbeda Waterfall

Caves 
 Alor cave
 Bijkudum cave
 Katthan-gundi cave

Valleys 
 Keshkal Valley

Archeological sites 
 Gobrahin
 Garh-dhanora
 Amrawati

Megalithic sites 
 Umradah (Here rock paintings have been found)
 Hata Pathra(Here rock paintings have been found)
 Ling-Darha Waterfall(Here rock paintings have been found)

References

 
Districts of Chhattisgarh
2012 establishments in Chhattisgarh
States and territories established in 2012